Easton Airport , also known as Easton/Newnam Field, is a county-owned, public-use airport located two nautical miles (4 km, or 2.5 miles) north of the central business district of Easton, a town in Talbot County, Maryland, United States.

Facilities and aircraft 
It has two asphalt paved runways: 4/22 measuring 5,500 x 100 ft (1,676 x 30 m) and 15/33 measuring 4,003 x 100 ft. (1,220 x 30 m).

There are precision approaches on runway 4 and 22. Runway 4 uses an ILS approach while runway 22 uses a GPS or NDB approach. All four runways use PAPI precision approach lights to help guide pilots on their final approach on landing.  As of late 2007, an Air traffic control tower has been built on field, due to the increasing number of aircraft at Easton Airport.  Easton is now a Class D (Delta) controlled airport with a ceiling of 2,600 feet.

For the 12-month period ending June 22, 2007, the airport had 160,000 aircraft operations, an average of 438 per day: 85% general aviation, 11% air taxi and 4% military. At that time there were 170 aircraft based at this airport: 72% single-engine, 15% multi-engine, 9% jet and 5% helicopter.

On field services include: 100LL and Jet A fuel, aircraft rental, aircraft sales, aircraft maintenance, aerial photography, flight school, charter flights, car rental, oxygen and T-hangars.

References

External links 
Easton Airport, official site

Easton Jet Service, FBO Website

Airports in Maryland
Transportation buildings and structures in Talbot County, Maryland
Easton, Maryland